Amri Kiemba Ramadhan is a Tanzanian footballer who plays club football for Simba and international football Tanzania.

International career

International goals
Scores and results list Tanzania's goal tally first.

References

External links

1983 births
Living people
Tanzanian footballers
Tanzania international footballers
Place of birth missing (living people)
Moro United F.C. players
Simba S.C. players
Association football midfielders
Tanzanian Premier League players